Zsolt Vinczeffy (born 23 September 1974) is a Hungarian cyclist. He competed in the men's cross-country mountain biking event at the 2004 Summer Olympics.

References

1974 births
Living people
Hungarian male cyclists
Olympic cyclists of Hungary
Cyclists at the 2004 Summer Olympics
Cyclists from Budapest